The men's 1500 metres event at the 2003 European Athletics U23 Championships was held in Bydgoszcz, Poland, at Zawisza Stadion on 18 and 20 July.

Medalists

Results

Final
20 July

Heats
18 July
Qualified: first 4 in each heat and 4 best to the Final

Heat 1

†: Ed Jackson, United Kingdom, in final according to the decision of the Jury of Appeal.

Heat 2

Participation
According to an unofficial count, 22 athletes from 13 countries participated in the event.

 (1)
 (1)
 (3)
 (1)
 (1)
 (2)
 (2)
 (1)
 (2)
 (1)
 (1)
 (3)
 (3)

References

1500 metres
1500 metres at the European Athletics U23 Championships